Albany International BV v Stichting Bedrijfspensioenfonds Textielindustrie (1999) C-67/96 is an EU law case, concerning the boundary between European labour law and European competition law in the European Union.

Facts
Albany International BV, a Dutch company, claimed that it should not be bound by a collective agreement to remain with a collective pension fund, as it alleged it was an "undertaking" that restricted competition. Albany BV was obliged by Dutch law to join a supplementary pension fund for workers within its industrial sector. Albany was in the industry pension (Stichting Bedrijfspensioenfonds Textielindustrie) since 1975. In 1981 it decided the pension was not generous enough. Albany BV entered into an arrangement providing enhanced benefits for its employees with an insurer. In 1989, the basis on which benefits under the compulsory scheme were paid out was improved, making it comparable with Albany's private arrangement. Albany therefore applied to be exempted from affiliation to the fund. The fund refused Albany's application and refused to follow the advice of the Insurance Board, requiring it to grant an exemption. The national court adopted the Board's decision, but stayed proceedings pending a reference to the ECJ on whether the Fund was an undertaking within the meaning of the EC Treaty article 85 (now TFEU article 101), article 86 (now TFEU article 102) and article 90 (now TFEU article 106). If so, it also asked whether compulsory fund membership nullified the effectiveness of competition rules applicable to undertakings, and if not, whether there were circumstances which could render compulsory membership incompatible with article 90.

Judgment

Advocate General
Advocate General Jacobs gave his opinion that pension funds set up pursuant to collective agreements were wholly outside the scope of competition law.

Court of Justice
The Court of Justice held that agreements made in the context of collective negotiations between employers and employees in pursuit of recognised social policy objectives were not caught by TFEU article 101 because the purpose of competition law was not to affect collective agreements, rather than to regulate anti-competitive business practices. There was no difficulty in compulsory affiliation with a sectoral pension fund, and competition law had no application. The pension fund was engaged in an economic activity, even though it was not profit making. It held a dominant position under TFEU article 102 but this was justified given the basis of the scheme in social solidarity. The Dutch government was entitled to consider whether an alternative of laying down minimum pension requirements would meet levels of pension payments achieved by compulsory fund membership.

See also
European Union law

Notes

References

European Union competition case law
European Union labour case law